Bigott Foundation is a private institution in Caracas, Venezuela; it is dedicated to "preserving and making known the values of traditional culture".

See also
 British American Tobacco

References 

Venezuelan culture
Foundations based in Venezuela
Organizations established in 1963
1963 establishments in Venezuela